Olivia Nalos Opre is a trophy hunter and 2003 Mrs. Nebraska and Mrs. America contestant who lives in Montana. She often hunts endangered species and she actively defends the practice in the media. She was a 2018 appointee to the Trump administration's conservation council.

Early life
Opre developed a love for hunting at 16 years old. She was a Mrs. Nebraska winner in 2003.

Career
Opre is a former Miss Nebraska who competed for the Miss America title. Her controversial career involves trophy hunting. She claims to have hunted on six continents: 100 different species of animals.  She has received death threats for her defense of trophy hunting and animal rights advocates have started a petition against her. She has often appeared in news media as an ambassador for trophy hunting. She and her husband host a show on NBC Sports outdoor called, Eye of The Hunter, she also is assists Jack Brittingham's World of Hunting Adventure. In 2015 she wrote an article for USA Today in defense of hunting entitled, "Why we hunt, even lions".

Controversy
In 2020 Opre hunted a rare Alpine ibex in Valais Switzerland. The hunt of the Ibex sparked a protest and another petition which accumulated 75,000 signatures. The Swiss defended the hunt saying the hunt was designed to cull the herd of older males, and the fee of $20,000 is used to subsidize local hunting permits.

Opre is often mentioned when there is criticism of trophy hunters, especially women hunters.

In 2018 she was appointed to the Trump administration's conservation council. At that time the Associated Press reported that Opre killed a hippo, a buffalo, a black rhino and a lion, all in Africa. Opre corrected the AP to say she had not killed rhino, but used a tranquilizer dart on the animal. Her appointment to the council was widely panned. The council only had one scientific expert; a veterinarian (zoo medicine) Jenifer Chatfield.

See also
 Animal–industrial complex
 Animal rights
Big-game hunting
Green hunting
 International Council for Game and Wildlife Conservation (CIC)

References

External links
Eye of the Hunter
 World of Hunting

1978 births
Living people
American beauty pageant winners
American hunters
American conservationists
People from Montana